The 2001 Canadian Professional Soccer League season was the fourth season for the Canadian Professional Soccer League. The season began on May 25, 2001 and concluded on October 14, 2001 with St. Catharines Wolves defeating Toronto Supra by a score of  1-0 to win their second CPSL Championship (known as the Rogers CPSL Cup for sponsorship reasons) . The final was hosted in St. Catharines with Club Roma Stadium as the venue, while the match received coverage from Rogers TV. The season saw the league expand to a total of 12 teams, and went beyond the GTA and Ontario border to include a Montreal and Ottawa franchise. Throughout the regular season the Ottawa Wizards became the first club to end the Toronto Olympians league title dynasty. The CPSL also launched the CPSL Soccer Show with Rogers TV providing the broadcasting, and granting Rogers naming rights to the CPSL Championship. Other major sponsors included the Government of Canada, which served as the sole sponsor for the CPSL Rookie of the Year Award. The league also announced a working partnership with the Canadian United Soccer League a task force originally started by the Canadian Soccer Association in order forge a unified professional structure with the cooperation of the Canadian franchises in the USL A-League to launch a Canadian first and second division domestic league.

Changes from 2000 season
All 8 clubs from the previous season returned, and the league expanded to include 4 new entries the Brampton Hitmen, Montreal Dynamites, Ottawa Wizards, and Toronto Supra all began play this year. Oshawa Flames changed their name to the Durham Flames in order to represent the entire Durham Region, and received sponsorship from Danone. Toronto Croatia transferred their home venue from Centennial Park Stadium to Memorial Park in Streetsville, Mississauga. Changes to the CPSL executive management committee saw former Director of Media Relations for the Toronto Lynx Stan Adamson appointed to the position of CPSL Director of Media and Public Relations.

Teams

Final standings

Rogers CPSL Championship playoffs

Wildcard

Semifinals

Consolation final

Rogers CPSL Championship

Rogers CPSL Championship MVP:
Garrett Caldwell (Toronto Supra)
Danny Gallagher (St. Catharines Roma Wolves)

All-Star game 
For the 2001 season the CPSL administration arranged two all-star matches for the league. In order to prepare for the 2001 Jeux de la Francophonie the Morocco national under-23 football team expressed a desire to play a solid Canadian team. Subsequently, the Canadian Soccer Association requested the CPSL to arrange a select team for the match. The second match consisted of a CPSL All-Star team against C.S. Marítimo of the Primeira Liga.

2001 scoring leaders
Full article: CSL Golden Boot

CPSL Executive Committee 
The 2001 CPSL Executive Committee.

Individual awards

The annual CPSL awards ceremony was held on October 14, 2001 at Club Roma in St. Catharines, Ontario. Expansion franchise Ottawa Wizards received the most awards with 3 wins. Trinidadian journeyman Kevin Nelson went home with both the Golden Boot, and the Rookie of the Year. While his teammate Abraham Osman was given the MVP. George Azcurra shared his second Goalkeeper of the Year award with Luciano Miranda.

Kurt Ramsey of the North York Astros won the Defender of the Year, and former Montreal Impact manager Zoran Jankovic went home with the Coach of the Year. Amato De Luca who later refereed matches at the international level and Major League Soccer was named the Referee of the Year. Durham Flames received the Fair Play award.

References

External links
Rocket Robin's Home Page of the 2001 CPSL Season

2001
2001 domestic association football leagues
Canadian Professional Soccer League